The Comilla Victorians are a franchise cricket team based in Comilla, Bangladesh, which plays in the Bangladesh Premier League (BPL). They are one of the seven teams that are competing in the 2016 Bangladesh Premier League. The team is being captained by Mashrafe Mortaza.

Player draft
The 2016 BPL draft was held on 30 September. Prior to the draft, the seven clubs signed 38 foreign players to contracts and each existing franchise was able to retain two home-grown players from the 2015 season. A total 301 players participated in the draft, including 133 local and 168 foreign players. 85 players were selected in the draft.

Standings

 The top four teams will qualify for playoffs
  advanced to the Qualifier
  advanced to the Eliminator

2016–17

Draft pick
Comilla Victorians entered the draft on 30 September 2016, where the team picked nine domestic and six overseas players. Captain of Bangladesh national cricket team captain Mashrafe Mortaza was retained to lead the team in second season. Mohammad Salahuddin was not retained as the coach, despite having a successful season. Mizanur Rahman Babul will be seen as the Head Coach for this season of Comilla Victorians.

Current squad

Sponsors and endorsement

References

Bangladesh Premier League